Ferei–CCN is a Belarusian UCI Continental cycling team founded in 2019. In 2019, the team competed under a Ukrainian registration.

After the 2022 Russian invasion of Ukraine, the UCI said that Belarusian teams are forbidden from competing in international events.

Team roster

References

External links

UCI Continental Teams (Europe)
Cycling teams based in Ukraine
Cycling teams based in Belarus
Cycling teams established in 2019
2019 establishments in Ukraine